Besao, officially the Municipality of Besao  is a 5th class municipality in the province of Mountain Province, Philippines. According to the 2020 census, it has a population of 6,873 people.

The municipality of Besao is believed to have derived its name from the Ilocano word "Buso", meaning headhunter. The people then of the neighboring towns specifically those from the Ilocos Region believed that the early ”Besaos” were headhunters. The word later on evolved as it is now called – Besao.

The town is known for the Agawa people's Agricultural Stone Calendar of Gueday. The stone calendar is one of the most enigmatic artifact in the Cordillera mountains. It is a testimony to the accurate scientific outlook of the ancient Agawa people in the cycle of weathers, agriculture, and heavenly bodies.

Geography

Barangays
Besao is politically subdivided into 14 barangays. These barangays are headed by elected officials: Barangay Captain, Barangay Council, whose members are called Barangay Councilors. All are elected every three years.
 Agawa
 Ambagiw
 Banguitan
 Besao East
 Besao West
 Catengan
 Gueday
 Lacmaan
 Laylaya
 Padangaan
 Payeo
 Suquib
 Tamboan
 Kin-iway (Poblacion)

Climate

Demographics

The population of the town has been decreasing due to younger generations migrating to cities seeking for work.

Religion
Besao's main religion is animism. The town is one of the few animist towns in the southern Cordillera mountains. Much of its ancestral worship intangible heritage has been preserved by the older generations. However, the younger generations have been migrating to cities, making the animist religions of Besao in great danger in the long-term. Christian groups have been surfacing in the town since the younger generations have been moving into cities.

Economy

Government
Besao, belonging to the lone congressional district of the province of Mountain Province, is governed by a mayor designated as its local chief executive and by a municipal council as its legislative body in accordance with the Local Government Code. The mayor, vice mayor, and the councilors are elected directly by the people through an election which is being held every three years.

Elected officials

Members of the Municipal Council (2019–2022):
 Congressman: Maximo Y. Dalog Jr.
 Mayor: Johnson D. Bantog II
 Vice-Mayor: June T. Lopsoten
 Councilors:
 Bryne O. Bacwaden
 Joel D. Lacsigen
 Elizabeth A. Buyagan
 John M. Antiyag
 Dennis L. Bing-il
 Edna S. Kidangen
 James B. Badongen Sr.
 William S. Beswilan

References

External links

Official Website of Besao, Mountain Province
 [ Philippine Standard Geographic Code]
Philippine Census Information

Municipalities of Mountain Province